Vietnam competed at the 2004 Summer Paralympics in Athens, Greece. The country was represented by four athletes competing in three sports: track and field, powerlifting and swimming. Vietnam's delegation had the particularity of being composed entirely of female athletes. None of them won a medal.

Athletics

In track and field, Nhu Thi Khoa took part in the 200m and 400m sprints, in the T54 and T53 categories respectively. In the former, she finished last in her heat, with a time of 35.98. In the latter, she was also last in her heat, completing the race in 1:03.26.

Powerlifting

Women

Swimming
In swimming, in the 100m breaststroke (SB11 category), Nguyen Thi Hao was a non-starter.

See also
Vietnam at the Paralympics
Vietnam at the 2004 Summer Olympics

References

Nations at the 2004 Summer Paralympics
2004
Paralympics